Bankstown railway station is located on the Bankstown line, serving the Sydney suburb of Bankstown. It is served by Sydney Trains T3 Bankstown line services.

History

Bankstown station opened on 14 April 1909, when the Bankstown line was extended from Belmore. It served as the terminus of the line until it was extended to Regents Park on the Main South line in 1928. Opposite platform 2 lies a parcel platform that was used by Electric Parcels Vans until 1966.

In December 2013, planning approval was granted for an upgrade project including the installation of new stairs, ramps, canopies and ticket barriers. Work commenced in July 2014 and completed in 2015.

Sydney Metro City & Southwest
Transport for NSW is currently extending the Sydney Metro to Bankstown, with a delayed opening date of 2025. Before the extension opens, the line between Bankstown and Sydenham will close, so that the nine intermediate stations can be converted for driverless Metro operation. Sydney Trains will continue to run services between Bankstown station and the Main Southern railway line to the west.

As part of the project, Bankstown station will be upgraded to have an additional at-grade station entrance at the eastern end of the existing platforms, which will align with The Appian Way and Restwell Street. The new entrance will also provide access to Sydney Metro platforms, which will be built east of the new entrance over the road connection between North and South Terraces. The existing station entrance will be retained and the existing platforms is proposed to be retained and extended westwards. The former parcels office, as well as a crossover at the eastern end of the station, will be removed for construction.

Platforms & services
Traditionally, services operated in a loop from the city via Sydenham to Bankstown, then on to Lidcombe, returning to the city via Strathfield and the Main Suburban line and vice versa. In more recent years alternate trains on the line were extended to Liverpool station and trains to Lidcombe no longer return via Strathfield. In the past, there were also limited services to Blacktown via a loop connection to the Main Western line near Lidcombe.

Currently services operate to Lidcombe and Liverpool on an alternate basis. To the west of the station, lies a headshunt to allow trains to terminate. This facility is only used by a few trains each night and during trackwork, as at other times, there are no trains scheduled to terminate at Bankstown.

Transport links

Punchbowl Bus Company operates six routes via Bankstown station:
939: to Greenacre
940: to Hurstville station
941: to Hurstville station
944: to Mortdale
945: to Hurstville station
946: to Roselands Shopping Centre

Transdev NSW operate 14 routes via Bankstown station::
905: to Fairfield station
907: to Parramatta station
908: to Merrylands station
909: to Parramatta station
911: to Auburn station
913: to Strathfield station
922: to East Hills
923: to Panania
924: to East Hills
925: Lidcombe to East Hills
926: to Revesby Heights (to Padstow weekdays off peak only)
M90: Liverpool station to Westfield Burwood
M91: Parramatta station to Hurstville
M92: Parramatta station to Sutherland station

Transit Systems operate one route from Bankstown station:
487: to Canterbury

Bankstown station is served by one NightRide route:
N40: East Hills station to Town Hall station

Trackplan

References

External links

Bankstown station details Transport for New South Wales
Bankstown Station Public Transport Map Transport for NSW
Bankstown Metro station Sydney Metro

Bankstown, New South Wales
Easy Access railway stations in Sydney
Railway stations in Sydney
Railway stations in Australia opened in 1909
Bankstown railway line